Gruppo Sportivo Vigili del Fuoco Otello Ruini (Ruini Firenze) is a sports club of the Fire Department of Florence, Italy.

The club is best known for its volleyball teams.  It also participates in rowing, wrestling, skiing, kickboxing.

History 
Ruini Firenze was started on 17 September 1962, on the initiative of the Fire Department of Florence. It was named after Otello Ruini, a firefighter who died in 1958,. A few months after its establishment, the club absorbed l'Alce ("the Moose"), a Florentine club in series A volleyball  This gave Ruini Firenze the chance to play in the national championship.

Led by Aldo Bellagambi, Ruini Firenze became a major volleyball club in Italy, winning five league titles (1963–64, 1964–65, 1967–68, 1970–71, 1972–73). After the relegation of 1974-75, the team experienced a rapid decline, which led to the abandonment of volleyball in 1980.

Ruini Firenze currently plays in amateur categories in Tuscany, In the 2007-2008 season, the volleyball team earned a promotion to series C.. The following season (2008-2009) Ruini Firenze reached the playoffs for promotion to B2, but did not succeed in boarding.

Honours 

 Italian Volleyball League titles: 1963-64, 1964–65, 1967–68, 1970–71, 1972–73
 CEV Champions League for volleyball runners-up (1): 1971-72

References

External links 
 Official site
 Scheda

Italian volleyball clubs
Sport in Florence
Sports clubs established in 1962
1962 establishments in Italy